Hutchinson Correctional Facility (HCF) is a state prison operated by the Kansas Department of Corrections located in Hutchinson, Kansas. 

The prison was originally known as the Kansas State Industrial Reformatory (KSIR) and designed to house younger offenders. Construction on KSIR began in 1885, but delays prevented completion of the facility, which would not begin housing inmates until 1895. The name of the facility was changed to Hutchinson Correctional Facility in 1990, and today the prison houses an average of 1,830 inmates.

Low security inmates at HCF have the opportunity to work on several projects such as highway maintenance, cleanup and maintenance at the annual state fair, assisting various public works departments of the city of Hutchinson and maintenance at Cheney State Park. The prison also offers the Kansas Wild Horse Program, which trains wild horses taken from land operated by the Bureau of Land Management.

Notable inmates include Israel Mireles, convicted murderer of internet model Emily Sander.

References

External links
 HCF
 HCF Visit
 HCF History
 Kansas Prison Inmate Database - Kansas Department of Corrections

Prisons in Kansas
Hutchinson, Kansas
Buildings and structures in Reno County, Kansas
1895 establishments in Kansas